Betaab may refer to:
 Betaab, a 1983 Indian Hindi romance film.
 Betaab Valley, a valley in the Indian state Jammu and Kashmir.